Just for Kicks is a 2005 American documentary film about the sneaker phenomena and history. It includes self-confessed "sneakerheads" like Grandmaster Caz, Reverend Run, and Missy Elliott. It tells the story of the Nike Air Force Ones, which are called "Uptowns" in New York, and the beginning of Air Jordans.  The documentary also tells the story of how hip-hop pioneers DJ Run, Jam Master Jay, and DMC had everyone wearing Adidas Superstars with their song "My Adidas".

Interviews 
 Grandmaster Caz
 Joseph Simmons
 Darryl McDaniels
 Damon Dash
 Doze
 Missy Elliott
 Bobbito Garcia
 Adam Horovitz
 Koe Rodriguez
 Futura 2000

Release 
Just For Kicks premiered at the Tribeca Film Festival on April 23, 2005. Image Entertainment released it on DVD on June 6, 2006.

Reception 
Dennis Harvey of Variety called it "aptly slick and stylish as a TV commercial".  Giovanni Fazio of The Japan Times rated it 2/5 stars and wrote that the film is more of an unwitting documentary about mental illness than it is about sneakers.  Gil Jawetz of DVD Talk rated it 2.5/5 stars and wrote that the filmmaker's enthusiasm for the subject is not enough to make it compelling.

Accolades 
The film won "Best Documentary", and "Best Overall Film" at the USVI Film festival. It was part of the official selection at Tribeca Film Festival, Sheffield Documentary Festival, International Documentary Film Festival Amsterdam, Bangkok International Film Festival, Res Fest, New York Latino Film Festival, San Francisco Black Film Festival, NYC Urban World Festival, Leipzig Documentary Festival, and US Virgin Islands Film Festivals.

References

External links 
 
 
 

2005 films
2005 documentary films
American documentary films
2000s hip hop films
Hip hop fashion
Sneaker culture
Films about fashion
2000s English-language films
2000s American films